Meiosimyza decempunctata is a species of small flies of the family Lauxaniidae.

References

Lauxaniidae
Muscomorph flies of Europe
Insects described in 1820